The Bombing of Nagoya in World War II by the United States Army Air Forces took place as part of the air raids on Japan during the closing months of the war.

History 
The first strategic bombing attack on Nagoya was on April 18, 1942, as part of the Doolittle Raid. A B-25 bomber targeted the Mitsubishi Aircraft Works, the Matsuhigecho oil warehouse, the Nagoya Castle military barracks, and the Nagoya war industries plant. However, it was not until the aerial attacks of 1944 and 1945 that Nagoya would suffer serious bomb damage.  

According to the United States Strategic Bombing Survey, during the last 9 months of the Pacific War 14,054 tons of bombs were dropped in precision and area air attacks on the factories and urban areas of Nagoya. No Japanese city other than Tokyo received as many attacks. The city was attacked 21 times between December 13, 1944 and July 24, 1945. The aim of the attacks was stated as "(1) mainly by precision attacks, to wipe out Nagoya's aircraft production and, later on, its ordnance production, and (2) mainly by area attacks, to knock out the city's remaining industries and to destroy the people's will to resist." 

The second phase began with precision bombing on December 13, 1944, targeting a Mitsubishi military factory. Four bombers were badly damaged during the mission and had to be abandoned. On December 18, another bombing raid took place, although there was such heavy cloud that the bombers needed to bomb by radar. Japanese fighter aircraft intercepted the attacking bombers and shot down one. On January 3, 1945, there was a general firebombing of the city. On January 14, 1945, Mitsubishi plants were attacked again. On March 11 or 12 (sources vary) and March 19, 1945, there were large air raids and widespread firebombing. On April 7, 1945, another precision bombing attack hit and destroyed most of the Mitsubishi Aircraft Engine Works. On May 14 and 16, 1945, there were large air raids and widespread firebombing that targeted the Mitsubishi factories and other war industries, the arsenal, railroad freight yards, and the seaport. Nagoya Castle, a national treasure which was being used as a military command post, was also hit during the May 14 raid and burned down.

Also during the winter of 1944 and spring of 1945 there were random single-bomber attacks that were used as psychological warfare to disrupt the city and damage the morale of the citizens. It is estimated that 113,460 buildings were destroyed during the raids, with 3,866 people killed and 471,701 driven from their homes. On July 26, 1945 the Enola Gay also dropped a conventional "pumpkin bomb" in the Yagoto area of Nagoya as part of a bombing raid to train for the upcoming nuclear bombing mission to Hiroshima.

Nagoya was targeted for incendiary bombing because it was the center of the Japanese aircraft industry at the time. The city produced between forty and fifty percent of Japan's combat aircraft and engines, including the Mitsubishi A6M Zero. Nagoya housed a port capable of holding 38 ships of up to 10,000 tons and produced equipment for the war effort including railway equipment, ball bearings and processed food.

See also
 Strategic bombing during World War II
 Evacuations of civilians in Japan during World War II
 Grave of the Fireflies

References

History of Nagoya
Nagoya
1945 in Japan